Edrich Lubbe (born 6 March 1993) is a South African cricketer. He made his first-class debut for Gauteng in the 2013–14 CSA Provincial Three-Day Competition on 13 February 2014.

References

External links
 

1993 births
Living people
South African cricketers
Gauteng cricketers
North West cricketers
Place of birth missing (living people)